Blanca Margarita Ovelar de Duarte (born September 2, 1957 in Concepción, Paraguay) is a Paraguayan politician and former Minister of Education. She was the Colorado Party's nominee for president in the April 2008 presidential election, in which she was defeated.

Ovelar served as education secretary under President Nicanor Duarte, and Duarte endorsed her bid for the presidency. Initial results showed Ovelar narrowly defeating her rival for the nomination, former Vice President Luis Castiglioni, in the party's primary, held in December 2007; however, the result was disputed, leading to a recount. On January 21, the Colorado Party electoral commission announced that Ovelar had won with 45.04% of the vote against 44.5% for Castiglioni, although Castiglioni continued to claim victory.

Not only would Ovelar have been Paraguay's first female president if elected, but she was the first woman to run for president. Opposition candidate Fernando Lugo won the election, held on April 20, 2008, thereby ousting the Colorado Party after 61 years of continuous rule. Ovelar conceded the race to Lugo at about 9 PM local time on election night.

References

External links
Campaign website
Lugo Wins Election at AP via Yahoo News

1957 births
Living people
People from Concepción, Paraguay
Colorado Party (Paraguay) politicians
Education Ministers of Paraguay
Members of the Senate of Paraguay
Women government ministers of Paraguay
21st-century Paraguayan women politicians